The following are the football (soccer) events of the year 1921 throughout the world.

Events
September – There is a split in Irish football following the political partition of Ireland. The leading Dublin clubs breakaway from the Belfast-based Irish Football Association over a perceived northern bias. See:FAI – Split from the IFA

Winners club national championship

Argentina: Club Atlético Huracán, Racing Club
Austria: Rapid Vienna
Belgium: Daring CB
Denmark: Akademisk Boldklub
England: Burnley F.C.
France: no national championship
Germany: 1. FC Nürnberg
Hungary: MTK Hungária FC
Iceland: Fram
Italy: Pro Vercelli
Luxembourg: Jeunesse Esch
Netherlands: NAC Breda
Paraguay: Club Guaraní
Poland: Cracovia
Scotland: For fuller coverage, see 1920–21 in Scottish football.
Scottish Division One – Rangers
Scottish Cup – Partick Thistle
Sweden: IFK Eskilstuna
Uruguay: Peñarol
Greece: 1913 to 1921 – no championship titles due to the First World War and the Greco-Turkish War of 1919–1922.

Founded clubs
 FK Željezničar

International tournaments
 1921 British Home Championship (October 23, 1920 – April 9, 1921)

1921 Far Eastern Championship Games in China (May 30-June 2, 1921)
 China

 South American Championship 1921 in Argentina (October 2, 1921 – October 30, 1921)

Births
February 10 – Theodor Reimann, Slovak international footballer  (died 1982)
May 12 – Cor van der Hoeven, Dutch footballer (died 2017)
July 26 – Amedeo Amadei, Italian international footballer and manager (died 2013)
October 19 – Gunnar Nordahl, Swedish international footballer (died 1995)
November 11 – Ron Greenwood, English football manager (died 2006)
Undated:
Arie Machnes, Israeli footballer (died 2008)

Clubs founded
 Deportivo Alavés

References

 
Association football by year